Estonian Cup 2007–08 was the twenty-first season of the Estonian football knockout tournament. Winners of the cup qualified for the UEFA Cup 2008–09 second qualifying round. The defending champion, Levadia, was knocked out in the semi-final in a penalty shoot-out against Flora.

The competition culminated with the final held at Kadrioru Stadium, Tallinn on 13 May 2008 with Flora taking the title 3 – 1. It was broadcast by Kalev Sport.

All in all, 71 teams took part of the competition.

First round
Only seven games were played in the first round, to take the number of teams down from 71 to 64, other 57 teams got byes. Two teams from Meistriliiga – TVMK Tallinn (winners in 2003, 2006; finalists in 2004, 2005) and Tulevik Viljandi (finalists in 1999; 2000) – started their journey from early on.

Second round

Third round

Fourth round

Quarter-finals
Four teams from Tallinn got through to the quarter-finals, including the defending champion Levadia. Three clubs from Tartu and one from Narva were also represented.

The win by Flora II was a bit unexpected, but as they had played well in the previous rounds, it was really no big surprise that they overcame the Meistriliiga side. Maag Tammeka had no problem defeating Santos, the only club from the second division. While the main team were victorious, Maag Tammeka's reserve team lost to Flora, conceding two goals in the first eight minutes and two more later in the game. The only game containing both teams from the Top Division culminated with an easy victory for Levadia against 2001 cup-winner Trans.

† – Välk 494 Tartu changed their name to FC Santos Tartu.

Semi-finals

Final
The clear favourite, Flora Tallinn, having won the competition twice before, in 1995 and 1997, attended the final for the sixth time. The underdog, Maag Tammeka Tartu, played in their first cup final, while also being only the second team from Tartu to reach that stage of the competition.

Top goalscorers

External links
 Official site

References
Estonia Cup 2007/08 Rec.Sport.Soccer Statistics Foundation

Estonian Cup seasons
Cup
Cup
Estonian